Porlezza is a comune (municipality) on Lake Lugano in the Province of Como in the Italian region Lombardy, located about  north of Milan and about  north of Como.

Porlezza borders the following municipalities: Bene Lario, Carlazzo, Claino con Osteno, Corrido, Lenno, Ossuccio, Ponna, Val Rezzo, Valsolda.

Between 1873 and 1939, Porlezza was linked to Menaggio, on Lake Como, by the Menaggio–Porlezza railway, a steam hauled narrow gauge line built as part of a multi-modal transport link between Menaggio and Luino, on Lake Maggiore.

References

External links

Porlezza - Lake Lugano

Cities and towns in Lombardy
Populated places on Lake Lugano